Ibrahim Mohammad Sami Sadeh (born 27 April 2000) is a Jordanian professional footballer who plays as a midfielder for Al-Jazeera Amman in the Jordanian Pro League. He represents the Jordan national team.

International career
Sadeh debuted for the Jordan national team in a 2–0 friendly win over Tajikistan on 1 February 2021.

References

External links
 

2000 births
Living people
People from Zarqa
Jordanian footballers
Jordan international footballers
Jordan youth international footballers
Association football midfielders
Jordanian Pro League players